Karin Bormann (born 22 May 1954) is a German former swimmer. She competed at the 1972 Summer Olympics and the 1976 Summer Olympics.

References

External links
 

1954 births
Living people
German female swimmers
Olympic swimmers of West Germany
Swimmers at the 1972 Summer Olympics
Swimmers at the 1976 Summer Olympics
Sportspeople from Düsseldorf